

Statistics Norway demographic statistics 

The following demographic statistics are from the Statistics Norway, unless otherwise indicated.

Age and sex distribution

Age structure

Norway 

(2005 est.) 
0–14 years: 19.7% (male 466,243; female 443,075) 
15–64 years: 65.6% (male 1,234,384; female 1,486,887) 
65 years and over: 14.7% (male 285,389; female 392,331)

Southern Norway 

(2009 est.) 
0–14 years: 19.8% (male 27,734; female 26,836) 
15–64 years: 66.1% (male 92,364; female 89,516) 
65 years and over: 14.1% (male 17,311; female 22,831)

Population

 257,869 (January 1, 2000)
 277,250 (July 1, 2009)
 Population growth
 19,381 (7.5%)

Population - comparative
slightly larger than Vanuatu and Barbados, but slightly smaller than Iceland and Maldives.

Population growth rate

1.31% (in 2008)

Population growth rate - comparative
slightly larger than Brazil, but slightly smaller than Oregon.

Total fertility rate

1.96 children born/woman (2007)

Language

Literacy

definition: age 15 and over can read and write 
total population: 100% 
male: NA% 
female: NA%

Demographics of Norway